Josephine Quirk (or Jo, as she was known to friends) (born c. 1900) was an American screenwriter, film producer, and writer active during Hollywood's silent era.

Biography 
Born in New York City into an Irish family, Quirk began her career as a publicity woman and magazine writer on the East Coast before transitioning into scenario writing in Los Angeles. She worked as a scenarist at Famous Players-Lasky before writing scripts for Chadwick Pictures. In 1929, she was hired to write a series of 12 two-reel stories featuring actor George McIntosh.

A devout Catholic, she eventually became disenchanted with Hollywood and what she perceived as its moral failings, and became a contributing editor at The Victorian (a Catholic magazine) and The Catholic Boy during the 1940s and 1950s, where she covered topics like juvenile delinquency, the ills of marijuana, the perils of alcohol, and Communism.

Selected filmography 

 Blondes by Choice (1927)
 The Love Wager (1927)
 Sunshine of Paradise Alley (1926)
 Friendly Enemies (1925)
 Bluff (1924)
 Daughters of the Rich (1923)
 Lovebound (1923)
 A Question of Honor (1922)
 Her Mad Bargain (1921)

References 

American women screenwriters
American women film producers
American film producers
1900s births
Year of birth uncertain
Year of death missing
Screenwriters from New York (state)
Writers from New York City
Film producers from New York (state)
American people of Irish descent
20th-century American writers
20th-century American women writers